Porfirio Becerril (born 31 July 1955) is a Mexican former diver who competed in two Olympics: the 1972 Summer Olympics and the 1976 Summer Olympics.

References

1955 births
Living people
Mexican male divers
Olympic divers of Mexico
Divers at the 1972 Summer Olympics
Divers at the 1976 Summer Olympics